Jalmenus clementi, the turquoise hairstreak or Clement's blue, is a butterfly of the family Lycaenidae. The species was first described by Hamilton Herbert Druce in 1902. It is found along the north-west coast of Western Australia.

The larvae feed on various Acacia species, including A. alexandri, A. inaequilatera and A. tetragonophylla.

The caterpillars are attended by ants of the genus Iridomyrmex.

References

Australian Faunal Directory

Theclinae
Butterflies of Australia
Moths described in 1902